Route 19 may refer to:
 One of several highways - see List of highways numbered 19
 One of several public transport routes - see List of public transport routes numbered 19